The India women's national under-21 field hockey team represent India in women's international under-21 field hockey competitions. It is controlled by Hockey India, the governing body for field hockey in India.

Tournament record

Junior Asia Cup
1992 – 
2000 – 
2004 – 
2008 – 
2012 – 
2015 – 4th place
2021 – Cancelled
Source

See also
India men's national under-21 field hockey team
India women's national field hockey team

References

National under-21
National under-21
Women's national under-21 field hockey teams
Hockey
Field hockey